Amaiur (Spanish language: Agrupaciones Electorales de Merindad, AMAIUR) was a Navarrese political coalition with a socialist and Basque nationalist ideology formed by the union of Herri Batasuna (HB), Euskadiko Ezkerra (EE) and the Communist Movement of Euskadi (EMK) in 1979, to contest the Navarrese elections of that year. The coalition gained 7 seats in the Parliament of Navarre.

References

 Various authors: Herri Batasuna: 20 años de lucha por la libertad. 1978-1998. Herri Batasuna, 1999. 

Defunct left-wing political party alliances
Defunct political party alliances in Spain
Defunct socialist parties in the Basque Country (autonomous community)
Political parties established in 1979
Political parties disestablished in 1983
Basque nationalism